Scott Langley (born April 28, 1989) is an American professional golfer. Langley is notable for making the cut at the 2010 U.S. Open as an amateur. Langley is the first alumnus of The First Tee to make it on the PGA Tour. He turned professional in 2011. He earned his PGA Tour card for 2013 at qualifying school.

Amateur accomplishments
Won the 2006 Wal-Mart First Tee Open at Pebble Beach
Won the 2007 AJGA Midwest Junior Players Championship
Placed second at the 2007 Metropolitan Amateur Championship
Placed fourth at the Missouri State High School Championship for Parkway South High School
Finished tied for 16th and was low amateur (tied with Russell Henley) at 2010 U.S. Open.
Quarter-finalist at 2010 U.S. Amateur
Qualified for match play at 2009 U.S. Amateur
Qualified for stroke play at 2008 U.S. Amateur
Won the 2008 Metropolitan Open Championship (St. Louis)
Won the 2009 Metropolitan Open Championship (St. Louis)
Won the 2010 Metropolitan Amateur Match Play Championship
Won the 2010 NCAA individual championship
Two-time All-American

Professional career
Langley turned professional in 2011. In his first event as a PGA Tour member, Langley carded an –8 (62) and led in the first round of the 2013 Sony Open in Hawaii. In the second round, he carded a –4 (66) positioning him into second. Langley ended the third round with a 65, tied for the lead with Russell Henley, another PGA Tour rookie. Langley finished T3, seven strokes behind Henley. He ended the PGA Tour Season 124th in FedEx Cup points and retained his card for the 2014 season.

On February 4, 2018, Langley won the Panama Championship on the Web.com Tour by two strokes.

On November 16, 2021, Langley announced on Twitter his retirement from professional golf.

Professional wins (1)

Web.com Tour wins (1)

Results in major championships

LA = Low amateur

"T" = tied for place

Results in The Players Championship

CUT = missed the halfway cut
"T" indicates a tie for a place

U.S. national team appearances
Amateur
Eisenhower Trophy: 2010
Palmer Cup: 2010 (winners)

See also
2012 PGA Tour Qualifying School graduates
2018 Web.com Tour Finals graduates

References

External links

American male golfers
Illinois Fighting Illini men's golfers
PGA Tour golfers
Korn Ferry Tour graduates
Golfers from Illinois
Golfers from Missouri
Golfers from Florida
Left-handed golfers
People from Barrington, Illinois
People from St. Louis County, Missouri
People from Palm Beach County, Florida
1989 births
Living people